Zhang Qinglian (July 31, 1908 – December 14, 2006) was a Chinese chemist, who was a member of the Chinese Academy of Sciences.

References 

1908 births
2006 deaths
Members of the Chinese Academy of Sciences